Flávio Rodolfo Gonçalves Cruz (born 28 August 1982) is a Portuguese volleyball player who plays for Castêlo da Maia and the Portugal national team. He earn honours as Best Spiker at the second 2008 Olympic Qualification Tournament in Espinho, where Portugal ended up in second place and missed qualification for the 2008 Summer Olympics.

Honours
 2008 Olympic Qualification Tournament — 2nd place (did not qualify)

References

External links
 Profile at FIVB.org
 

1982 births
Living people
Sportspeople from Matosinhos
Portuguese men's volleyball players
S.L. Benfica volleyball players